A1 Team Switzerland is the Swiss team of A1 Grand Prix, an international racing series. The team were the A1 Grand Prix champions for the third season, 2007-08.

Management
A1 Team Switzerland is owned by Max Welti.

History
In the inaugural season, Team Switzerland were "best of the rest", with a victory and ten podiums, finishing 2nd in the championship.

Team Switzerland lost their competitive edge in 2006-07, with only a single race victory, and finishing 8th in the championship.

After a spectacular 2007–08 season, Neel Jani single-handedly clinched the championship for Team Switzerland, with four victories and seven podiums.

In 2008–09, after having scored 4 wins and 3 other podium finishes, Neel Jani scored a total of 95 points for Team Switzerland. At the end of the season, the team finished second in the championship, 17 points behind the champions, Team Ireland, and just 3 points ahead of Team Portugal.

Drivers
Rahel Frey and Natacha Gachnang were the two first females to drive an A1 Grand Prix car during a race weekend.

They first drove as test drivers during a test session at Silverstone. Natacha Gachnang drove in the rookie sessions in the 2007-08 Czech round, on October 12, 2007; and Rahel Frey in the 2007-08 Malaysian rookie sessions, on November 23, 2007.

Complete A1 Grand Prix results
(key), "spr" indicates the Sprint Race, "fea" indicates the Feature Race.

References

External links
Official A1 Grand Prix website a1gp.com
A1 Team Switzerland Official team website at a1gp.com

Switzerland A1 team
A
Swiss auto racing teams
Auto racing teams established in 2005
Auto racing teams disestablished in 2009